Glossodoris acosti is a species of sea slug, a dorid nudibranch, a shell-less marine gastropod mollusk in the family Chromodorididae.

Distribution 
The type locality for species is Rempi, Madang Province, Papua New Guinea. Paratypes from the Philippines are included in the original description. Probably widespread in the central Indo-Pacific Ocean.

Description
Previously confused with Glossodoris cincta this species is distinguished by details of colouring and internal anatomy as well as DNA sequences from other species of very similar appearance.

References

Chromodorididae
Gastropods described in 2018